Calephelis wrighti, or Wright's metalmark, is a species of metalmark in the butterfly family Riodinidae. It is found in North America.

The MONA or Hodges number for Calephelis wrighti is 4390.

References

Further reading

 

Riodinini
Articles created by Qbugbot
Butterflies described in 1930